That Peter Crouch Podcast is an entertainment and sports podcast hosted by Peter Crouch and Chris Stark. Ostensibly a guide on how to be a professional footballer, the episodes include insight on everything from dressing rooms, transfers, managers, football confessions and other details of the modern game.

The podcast has been consistently one of the most popular podcasts in the UK since its launch, attracting 12 million listens in 2019.

Awards
The podcast has been well received, winning the 2019 British Podcast Awards, Spotlight Award. The judges said That Peter Crouch Podcast, "found a totally new perspective on one of the nation’s most discussed pastimes. Full of wit and personality, this is a podcast that has brought people together, regardless of which club they support." The podcast also won a silver award for the "Best Sports Show" at the 2020 Audio and Radio Industry Awards.

Series overview

Episodes

Season 1 (2018)

Season 2 (2019)

References

External links
 

Audio podcasts
British podcasts
2018 podcast debuts 
Sports podcasts